Christopher Michael Woodward (born June 27, 1976) is an American former professional baseball utility player, coach and manager. He played in Major League Baseball (MLB) for the Toronto Blue Jays, New York Mets, Atlanta Braves, Seattle Mariners, and Boston Red Sox, from 1999 through 2012. He then served as a coach for the Mariners and Los Angeles Dodgers, from 2014 through 2018 and managed the Texas Rangers from 2019 to 2022. He is currently a special assistant and roving instructor for the Dodgers.

Baseball career

Amateur career
Woodward attended Northview High School in Covina, California, and Mt. San Antonio College.

Toronto Blue Jays
The Toronto Blue Jays selected Woodward in the 54th round of the 1994 Major League Baseball draft. He made his major league debut on June 7, 1999, hitting a sacrifice fly in an 8–2 loss to the New York Mets.

From 2002 through 2004, Woodward was the starting shortstop in about half of Toronto's games. On August 7, 2002, he achieved a rare feat by hitting three home runs in one game as a shortstop (the first as a Blue Jay and the 15th overall). After an injury-plagued and difficult offensive season in 2004, the Blue Jays released him.

New York Mets
In 2005, Woodward signed with the New York Mets. Woodward was the epitome of flexibility, playing at seven different positions including the entire infield and performing well off the bench and as a starter and even managed two game-winning hits. In 2006, he struggled with injuries and the Mets chose not to re-sign him.

Atlanta Braves

On December 20, 2006, Woodward agreed to a one-year deal with the Atlanta Braves. He went through a huge down season in Atlanta however, hitting an MLB-position player worst .199 with one home run.

Yankees, Phillies, and Brewers
On February 8, 2008, Woodward signed a minor league contract with the New York Yankees then was released on March 26 and signed with the Philadelphia Phillies on March 28, 2008, where he was assigned to the Phillies' Triple-A affiliate, the Lehigh Valley IronPigs. On May 2, 2008, Woodward was released. He signed a minor league contract with the Milwaukee Brewers on May 31, 2008, and was assigned to the Triple-A Nashville Sounds. He became a free agent following the season.

Seattle Mariners
Woodward signed a minor league contract with an invitation to spring training with the Seattle Mariners in 2009.  On June 19, 2009, Woodward was called up from the Triple-A Tacoma Rainiers after second baseman José López was placed on the bereavement list. He made his debut for the Mariners that night, in their 4–3 win against the Arizona Diamondbacks, he was 2 for 4 in that game with a stolen base and a run scored. On August 4, Woodward was designated for assignment to make way for Adrián Beltré who was activated from the 15-day disabled list the same day.

He hit .299 with 52 hits, 12 doubles, one triple, one home run, 15 runs batted in (RBIs) and four stolen bases in 51 games with the Triple-A Rainiers. With the Mariners he hit .239 with one double and five RBIs in 20 games.

Boston Red Sox
On August 7, Woodward was claimed off waivers by the Boston Red Sox only to be designated for assignment eight days later on August 15, due to the acquisition of Álex González. He was later optioned to the Triple-A Pawtucket Red Sox and would be called up in September when rosters expanded.

Second stint with the Mariners
Woodward and the Seattle Mariners reached an agreement on a minor league contract with an invitation to spring training on January 6, 2010.

Second stint with the Blue Jays

On March 14, 2011, Woodward signed a minor league contract with the Toronto Blue Jays. Woodward was called up by the Blue Jays organization on April 21, 2011. He was outrighted to the minors on April 28. He returned to the team on September 4 for the remainder of the season. For the season, he was hitless and did not reach base in ten at bats. He was named a 2011 MILB.COM Toronto Organization All Star, after batting 296/.353/.474 with 13 home runs in 422 at bats in AAA for the Las Vegas 51s.

He became a free agent after the season, and re-signed to a minor league contract for 2012 by the Toronto Blue Jays, who invited him to spring training. On April 3, Woodward was assigned to the Las Vegas 51s. With them, in 2012 he batted .285/.338/.392 with 2 home runs, 34 RBIs, and 4 stolen bases in 309 at bats.

Coaching and managing career

Seattle Mariners
Woodward retired on November 1, 2012 and joined the Seattle Mariners organization as minor league infield coordinator. He became the Mariners' infield coach in 2014, and served as the Mariners first base coach in 2015, but opted not to return for the 2016 season after manager Lloyd McClendon was fired.

Los Angeles Dodgers
On December 17, 2015, he was named the third base coach for the Los Angeles Dodgers. He spent the 2016 through 2018 seasons in that position.

Woodward managed New Zealand in the 2017 World Baseball Classic qualification tournament in Australia in 2016. Woodward interviewed for the New York Yankees manager position after the 2017 season, which eventually went to Aaron Boone.

Texas Rangers
On November 2, 2018, Woodward agreed to a three-year contract to be the manager of the Texas Rangers beginning with the 2019 season. On March 24, 2021, the Rangers exercised Woodward's option for the 2022 season. On November 19, 2021, the Rangers signed Woodward to a contract extension through the 2023 season, with a club option for 2024. The Rangers fired Woodward on August 15, 2022.

Dodgers front office
Prior to the 2023 season, Woodward was hired by the Dodgers as a special assistant in the front office as well as a roving infield instructor for their organization.

Managerial record

Personal life
Woodward is married to Erin Woodward, with whom he has three children. He met his wife, a native of Aurora, Ontario, while playing with the Toronto Blue Jays. He resides in Chandler, Arizona. In 2004, Woodward was featured in an episode of Degrassi: The Next Generation.

References

External links

Chris Woodward at Baseball Almanac
Chris Woodward at Ultimate Mets Database

1976 births
Living people
American expatriate baseball players in Canada
Atlanta Braves players
Baseball coaches from California
Baseball players from California
Boston Red Sox players
Dunedin Blue Jays players
Hagerstown Suns players
Knoxville Smokies players
Las Vegas 51s players
Lehigh Valley IronPigs players
Los Angeles Dodgers coaches
Major League Baseball first base coaches
Major League Baseball infielders
Major League Baseball third base coaches
Medicine Hat Blue Jays players
Mt. SAC Mounties baseball players
Nashville Sounds players
New York Mets players
Pawtucket Red Sox players
People from Covina, California
People from Palm Harbor, Florida
Seattle Mariners coaches
Seattle Mariners players
Sportspeople from Los Angeles County, California
Sportspeople from the Tampa Bay area
Syracuse SkyChiefs players
Tacoma Rainiers players
Texas Rangers managers
Toronto Blue Jays players
American expatriate baseball players in Mexico
Venados de Mazatlán players